These films deal with the Holocaust in Europe, comprising both documentaries and narratives. They began to be produced in the early 1940s before the extent of the Holocaust at that time was widely recognized. 

The films span a range of genres, with documentary films including footage filmed both by the Germans for propaganda and by the Allies, compilations, survivor accounts and docudramas, and narrative films including war films, action films, love stories, psychological dramas, and even comedies. 

 
Narrative films: 1940s1950s1960s1970s1980s 1980s1990s2000s2010s2020s
Documentary films: 1940s1950s1960s1970s1980s 1990s2000s2010s2020s
See alsoReferences

1940s

1950s

1960s

1970s

1980s

1990s

2000s

2010s 
{| class="wikitable sortable"
|-
! Year
! Country 
! Title
! Directors
! Notes
|
|-
|2010
|United StatesPoland
|Esther's Diary
|Mariusz Kotowski
|Features original footage from the Auschwitz-Birkenau State Museum
|
|-
|2010
|France
|Sarah's Key
|Gilles Paquet-Brenner
|An adaptation of the novel Elle s'appelait Sarah by Tatiana De Rosnay
|
|-
|2010
|Czech RepublicAustriaGermany
|Habermann
|Juraj Herz
|Based on true events and is the first major motion picture to dramatize the expulsion of 3 million Germans from Czechoslovakia.
|
|-
|2010
|France
|The Round Up
|Rose Bosch
|The Vel' d'Hiv Roundup.
|
|-
|2010
|China
|A Jewish Girl in Shanghai
|Wang Genfa, Zhang Zhenhui
|Animated. Life of a Jewish girl with her little brother in Shanghai, and her parents in Europe.
|
|-
|2011
|Poland
|In Darkness
|Agnieszka Holland
|Nominated for Best Foreign Language Film at the 84th Academy Awards.
|
|-
|2011
|Germany
|Wunderkinder
|Markus Rosenmüller
|Story about deep friendship between three musically talented children.
|
|-
|2011
|Spain
|El ángel de Budapest
|Luis Oliveros
|The plot focuses on Ángel Sanz Briz, a Spanish ambassador in Hungary during World War II. Operating until early 1944 in Budapest, he helped to save the lives of thousands of Jews from the Holocaust.
|
|-
|2012
|Poland
|Aftermath
|Wladyslaw Pasikowski
|Aftermath (Polish: Pokłosie) - the fictional Holocaust-related thriller and drama is inspired by the July 1941 Jedwabne pogrom in occupied north-eastern Poland
|
|-
|2012
|Netherlands
|Süskind
|Rudolf van den Berg
|Based on the true story of Walter Süskind
|
|-
|2012
|Macedonia
|The Third Half
|Darko Mitrevski
|
|
|-
|2012
|Serbia
|When Day Breaks
|Goran Paskaljević
|
|-
|2013
|Argentina
|The German Doctor
|Lucía Puenzo
|Original title: Wakolda
|
|-
|2013
|Germany
|An Apartment in Berlin
|Alice Agneskirchner
|German TV film. The story of the family Adler living in Berlin, betrayed by Stella Goldschlag murdered in Auschwitz in 1944 and three young students moving from Israel to Berlin.
|
|-
|2013
|GermanyPoland
|Run Boy Run
|Pepe Danquart
|
|
|-
|2013
|Switzerland
|Akte Grüninger
|Alain Gsponer
|Based on the true story of Paul Grüninger.
|
|-
|2013
|Czech RepublicSlovakia
|Colette
|Milan Cieslar
|An adaptation of the novel A girl from Antwerp by Arnošt Lustig
|
|-
|2013
|PolandDenmark
|Ida
|Paweł Pawlikowski
|Won Academy Award for Best Foreign Language Film at the 87th Academy Awards
|
|-
|2014
|Poland
|Warsaw 44
|Jan Komasa
|Original title Miasto '44
|
|-
|2014
|Germany
|Labyrinth of Lies
|Giulio Ricciarelli
|
|
|-
|2014
|France
|To Life
|Jean-Jacques Silbermann
|
|
|-
|2015
|Germany
|Naked Among Wolves
|Philipp Kadelbach
|
|
|-
|2015
|Germany
|The People vs. Fritz Bauer
|Lars Kraume
|
|
|-
|2015
|Canada
|Remember
|Atom Egoyan
|Won Best Original Screenplay at 4th Canadian Screen Awards
|
|-
|2015
|RussiaGermany
|The Way Out
|Mikhail Uchitelev
|Short. Accepted at the Short Film Corner of the 68th Cannes Festival
|
|-
|2015
|Hungary
|Son of Saul
|László Nemes
|Won Academy Award for Best Foreign Language Film at the 88th Academy Awards; Winner of the Grand Prix at the 2015 Cannes Film Festival; Winner of the Best Foreign Language Film Category at the 73rd Golden Globe Awards; Winner of Best International Film at the 31st Independent Spirit Awards
|
|-
|2015
|Germany
|Meine Tochter Anne Frank
|Raymond Lay
|German television film about Anne Frank, on the view of her father
|
|-
|2016
|Germany
|Das Tagebuch der Anne Frank
|Hans Steinbichler
|German cinematographic feature about Anne Frank
|
|-
|2016
|United States
|Denial
|Mick Jackson
|Adaptation of the book Denying the Holocaust
|
|-
|2017
|United States
|The Zookeeper's Wife
|Niki Caro
|Adaptation of the novel The Zookeeper's Wife
|
|-
|2017
|Hungary
|1945
|Ferenc Török
|Winner of multiple international film awards
|
|-

|2017
|United States
|The Man with the Iron Heart
|Cédric Jimenez
|Based on French writer Laurent Binet's novel HHhH
|
|-
|2017
|France
|Un sac de billes
|Christian Duguay
|
|
|-
|2017
|IsraelAustria
|Ha Edut (The Testament)
|Amichai Greenberg
|
|
|-
|2018
|Russia
|Sobibor
|Konstantin Khabensky
|
|
|-
|2018
|Germany
|Never Look Away
|Florian Henckel von Donnersmarck
|
|
|-
|2018
|United States
|Operation Finale
|Chris Weitz
|Follows the efforts of Israeli intelligence officers to capture former SS officer Adolf Eichmann in 1960
|
|-
|2018
|Philippines
|Quezon's Game
|Matthew Rose
|Features Philippine President Manuel L. Quezon's plan to provide refuge for Jews fleeing from Nazi Germany.
|
|-
|2018
|Spain
|The Photographer of Mauthausen
|Mar Targarona
|Story of Francisco Boix and his covert documentation of life at Mauthausen Concentration Camp
|
|-
|2018
|PolandGermanyNetherlands
|Werewolf
|Adrian Panek
|
|
|-
|2018
|United States
|The Samuel Project
|Marc Fusco
|
|
|-
|2018
|Germany
|Transit
|Christian Petzold
|Adaptation of the novel Transit by Anna Seghers
|
|-
|2019
|United States
|Jojo Rabbit
|Taika Waititi
|Adaptation of the novel Caging Skies by Christine Leunens
|
|-
|2019
|Canada Hungary
|The Song Of Names
|Françoise Girard
|Adaptation of the novel "The Song Of Names by Norman Lebrecht
|
|}

 2020s 

 Documentary films 

 1940s 

 1950s 

 1960s 

 1970s 

 1980s 

 1990s 

 2000s 

 2010s 

 2020s 

 See also 
 List of World War II films
 List of films made in the Third Reich
 List of Allied propaganda films of World War II
 Imaginary Witness: Hollywood and the Holocaust''

Further reading

References

 
 
Lists of films by topic
Lists of World War II films
Films